This is a list of notable Indian comedy films.

Hindi films

Malayalam films

Tamil films

See also
 List of Indian romance films
 List of Indian horror films

 *
Comedy films
Indian